Taro Chiezo (千恵藏 太郎 Chiezō Tarō) is a Japanese artist based in Manhattan. His works include SuperLambBanana, a sculpture in Liverpool, England of a Lamb with its back as a banana.

In 1998, Taro Chiezo created the original ‘Superlambanana’ monument in Liverpool using city history of the docks combined with the bananas and cargo ships.

References

External links
 "Day Dream"

Japanese contemporary artists
Living people
Year of birth missing (living people)
Place of birth missing (living people)